HEC or hec may refer to:

Math and science
 Habitable Exoplanets Catalog
 HEC syndrome, a medical condition characterized by hydrocephalus, endocardial fibroelastosis and cataracts
 Highly emetogenic chemotherapy, a term for chemotherapy drugs associated with a high incidence of chemotherapy-induced nausea and vomiting
 Hyperelliptic curve, a particular type of algebraic curve
 Hyperinsulinemic euglycemic clamp, a test to measure insulin resistance
 Hydroxyethyl cellulose, a gelling and thickening agent derived from cellulose

Organizations
 Hautes Études Commerciales (disambiguation), French language business schools in Francophone countries
 Higher Education Commission (disambiguation)
 Hongkong Electric Company
 Hotel Ezra Cornell, Cornell Hotel School student-run Hospitality Leadership Conference
 Hydro Tasmania, previously known as the Hydro-Electric Commission
 Hyundai Engineering (HEC), a Korean firm founded in 1974

People

Nickname
 Hec Clouthier (born 1949), Canadian Member of Parliament
 Hec Crighton (fl. 1952–1986), Canadian Hall-of-Fame high school football coach
 Hec Cyre (1901–1971), Canadian-born National Football League player
 Hector Dyer (1910-1990), American sprinter
 Hec Edmundson (1886–1964), American basketball coach
 Hec Fowler (1892–1987), Canadian ice hockey player
 Art Garvey (1900-1973), American National Football League player
 Hec Gervais (1934–1997), Canadian curler
 Hec Highton (1923–1985), Canadian National Hockey League player
 Hector Hogan (1931-1960), Australian sprinter
 Hec Kilrea (1907–1969), Canadian National Hockey League player
 Hec Lalande (1934–2010), Canadian National Hockey League player
 Hector Lépine (1897-1951), Canadian National Hockey League player
 Hector Pothier (born 1954), former Canadian Football League player
 Hector Waller (1900-1942), Royal Australian Navy captain
 Hec Yeomans (1895-1968), Australian rules footballer

Given name (presumed)
 Hec Davidson (1908–1976), former Australian rules footballer
 Hec McKay (fl. 1904–1935), Australian rules footballer
 Hec Oakley (1909–1998), Australian cricketer

Other uses
 Hollerith Electronic Computer, Britain's first mass-produced business computer
 Header Error Control, a method used in some telecommunication protocols
 HDMI Ethernet Channel, technology that consolidates video, audio and data streams into a single HDMI cable
 the title character of Hec Ramsey, a television Western (1972–1974)
 Heckington railway station, England; National Rail station code HEC
 HEC-meeting, the Heart of Europe Bio-Crystallography Meeting
 Human equivalent concentration

Lists of people by nickname